Digit may refer to:

Mathematics and science
 Numerical digit, as used in mathematics or computer science
 Hindu-Arabic numerals, the most common modern representation of numerical digits
 Digit (anatomy), the most distal part of a limb, such as a finger or toe
 Digit (unit), an ancient measurement unit
 Hartley (unit) or decimal digit, a unit of information entropy

Personalities
 Digit, a gorilla studied by Dian Fossey, killed by poachers and buried near Fossey's grave
 Digit Fund, now the Dian Fossey Gorilla Fund International, founded by Fossey to raise money for anti-poaching patrols

Arts and media
 Digit (Cyberchase), a character in the TV series Cyberchase
 Digit (EP), by Echobelly, 2000
 Digit (magazine), an Indian information technology magazine
 Liquid and digits, a type of gestural, interpretive, rave and urban street dance

See also
Dig It (disambiguation)
Digital (disambiguation)